Mikkel Dahl-Jessen (born 20 December 1994) is a Danish middle-distance and long-distance runner.

In 2017, he competed in the senior men's race at the 2017 IAAF World Cross Country Championships held in Kampala, Uganda. He finished in 102nd place. In the same year, he also represented Denmark at the 2017 Summer Universiade held in Taipei, Taiwan in the men's 1500 metres event. He did not qualify to compete in the final.

In 2019, he competed in the senior men's race at the 2019 IAAF World Cross Country Championships held in Aarhus, Denmark. He finished in 104th place. In the same year, he also represented Denmark at the 2019 Summer Universiade held in Naples, Italy. He finished in 8th place in the men's 1500 metres.

In 2021, he competed in the men's 3000 metres event at the 2021 European Athletics Indoor Championships held in Toruń, Poland.

References

External links 
 

Living people
1994 births
Place of birth missing (living people)
Danish male middle-distance runners
Danish male long-distance runners
Danish male cross country runners
Competitors at the 2017 Summer Universiade
Competitors at the 2019 Summer Universiade
21st-century Danish people